The 10 May 2010 Iraq attacks were a series of bomb and shooting attacks that occurred in Iraq on 10 May 2010, killing over 114 people and injuring 350, the highest death toll for a single day in Iraq in 2010.

Background
Following the inconclusive 2010 Iraqi elections, these attacks were believed to be an attempt to further destabilise Iraq. Major General Qassim al-Moussawi, an Iraqi Army spokesman, gave a statement on 10 May in which he said "Al-Qaeda is trying to ... use some gaps created by some political problems".

According to official statistics, violent deaths in Iraq decreased slightly in April 2010 compared with April 2009.

Attacks
A fourth car bomb targeted the crowd and emergency services at the scene, according to police Captain Ali al-Shimmari. The bombs killed a total of 45 people, leaving 140 wounded.

Fallujah, which had previously seen intense battles between insurgents and American troops was targeted with at least two deaths resulting from bomb blasts. There were also attacks in Iskandariya, Mosul, Samarra and Al Tarmia (Tarmiyah).

There were multiple shootings across the country, particularly at checkpoints in Baghdad. According to officials, as Baghdad's nightly curfew lifted at 05:00 local time, gunmen disguised as municipal street cleaners attacked 10 police and army checkpoints across the city, killing as many as 9 soldiers and officers, and wounding 24.

Responsibility
While no organization claimed responsibility, Iraqi authorities blamed Al-Qaeda in Iraq for the attacks, which came shortly after U.S. and Iraqi forces killed two high-ranking members of Al-Qaeda in Iraq.

See also

 Terrorist incidents in Iraq in 2010

References

2010 murders in Iraq
21st-century mass murder in Iraq
Mass murder in 2010
Spree shootings in Iraq
Suicide car and truck bombings in Iraq
Bombings in the Iraqi insurgency
Islamic terrorist incidents in 2010
Terrorist incidents in Iraq in 2010
Terrorist incidents in Baghdad
May 2010 events in Iraq
Mass murder in Baghdad
Building bombings in Iraq